Oblique subduction is a form of subduction (i.e. a tectonic process involving the convergence of two plates where the denser plate descends into Earth's interior) for which the convergence direction differs from 90° to the plate boundary. Most convergent boundaries involve oblique subduction, particularly in the Ring of Fire including the Ryukyu, Aleutian, Central America and Chile subduction zones. In general, the obliquity angle is between 15° to 30°. Subduction zones with high obliquity angles include Sunda trench (ca. 60°) and Ryukyu arc (ca. 50°).

Obliquity in plate convergence causes differences in dipping angle and subduction velocity along the plate boundary. Tectonic processes including slab roll-back, trench retreat (i.e. a tectonic response to the process of slab roll-back that moves the trench seaward) and slab fold (i.e. buckling of subducting slab due to phase transition) may also occur.

Moreover, collision of two plates leads to strike slip deformation of the forearc, thus forming a series of features including forearc slivers and strike slip fault systems that are sub-parallel to ocean trenches. In addition, oblique subduction is associated with the closure of ancient ocean, tsunami and block rotations in several regions.

Deformation features

Forearc slivers 

Forearc slivers are partly detached continental blocks of the overriding plates. They are bounded by the trenches and trench parallel strike slip fault systems. The motion of forearc slivers depend on the obliquity of the subducting slabs.

Moreover, some forearc slivers occur in the absence of well defined strike-slip fault systems, and sliver motions are not purely strike-slip.

Trench parallel strike-slip fault systems 
Trench parallel strike-slip faults are deformational products contributed by trench parallel component of strain partitioning. They are located between the forearc slivers and the remaining overriding plates.

Orientation of strike slip faults 
Vertical strike slip fault systems are generally accepted by the early literature of oblique subduction. However, modern technology, such as seismic profiling, reveals that the faults are not necessarily vertical. Several other models concerning the orientations of the faults are proposed.

Slip accommodating mechanisms 
Trench parallel slip component from oblique subduction may not be fully accommodated by the aforementioned trench parallel strike slip faults. Several models suggest that there are other slip accommodating mechanisms formed by oblique subduction as means to take up the remaining slip component.

Margin parallel strike-slip faults in subducting plates 

Ishii et al., (2013) suggested that the trench parallel strike-slip faults may appear in the obliquely subducting slabs to accommodate a portion of the trench parallel slip component.

In the Sumatra subduction zone, the trench parallel slip component is measured to be approximately 45 mm per year, the motion rate of northern Great Sumatra Fault ranges from 1 to 9 mm per year with the maximum rate of 13 mm per year. The result shows that the trench parallel slip component of at least 32 mm per year is left.

On 11 April 2012, a Mw 8.6 earthquake occurred in the subducting plate (i.e. the Indo-Australian Plate). Strike-slip seismicity was recorded in the earthquake. This infers strike slip fault systems are present in the descending slab and they may potentially accommodate slip component from oblique subduction.

Strain partitioning 

Strain partitioning is a form of deformation. In oblique subduction zone, strain partitioning is initiated into trench parallel component and trench normal component. The trench parallel component is accommodated by localized shear zones (short-term deformation) or trench parallel strike slip fault systems (long-term deformation) in the overriding plates. Likewise, this component commonly leads to the formation of forearc slivers. The trench normal component is taken up by thrust structures. These thrusts are generally discontinuous and their geometries change progressively.

Short-term deformation: Localized shear zone 

Short-term deformation is mainly elastic and acts at human time scale. When the denser plate subducts beneath the upper plate, they are coupled at the interface (i.e. plate coupling). The process of plate coupling thus generates tectonic force that follows the subduction direction.

The orientation of tectonic force gradually rotates toward the trench normal direction. This attributes to the decline of trench parallel component when the force leaves the plate coupling zone. In this way, only the frontal part, rather than the whole upper plate, is dragged by the subducting slab.

Long-term deformation: Formation of forearc sliver and strike slip fault 

Long-term deformation occurs at geological time scale. Under continuous oblique subduction, the aforementioned frontal part of the upper plate permanently accommodates the trench parallel component. In this way, the orientation of tectonic force rotates gradually toward the trench parallel direction.

Strong and continuing tectonic force in trench parallel direction leads to the development of trench parallel strike slip fault system. The fault thus separate a portion of the forearc from the overriding plate, forming the forearc sliver.

Tectonic events related to oblique subduction

The 1771 Great Yaeyama Tsunami 

The tsunami occurred in the southwestern part of the Ryukyu arc. Yukinobu et al., (2018) suggested that oblique subduction  was the primary reason leading to the occurrence of the tsunami.

Tectonic setting 
In the plate boundary, an approximately 80 km long and 30 km wide depression is observed. It obscures trench parallel strike slip fault and the topographic ridge of the wedge.

Oblique subduction and tsunami

Block rotation 

Oblique subduction has led to rotation of microblocks about nearby poles of rotation (See also: Euler poles) in some oblique subduction zones. In these regions, the trench parallel strike slip fault systems are less prominent. This is because a portion of the trench parallel component is accommodated by the microblock rotation.

Examples of oblique subduction-induced block rotation are identified in North Island, Cascadia and New Guinea.

Example: North Island oblique subduction zone

Tectonic setting 
The North Island oblique subduction zone in New Zealand was established by the obliquely subducting Pacific Plate beneath the Indo-Australian Plate. A trench parallel strike slip fault system, North Island Dextral Fault Belt, was formed. Based on geological and geodetic data, five tectonic blocks are identified in the region. These blocks are separated by block-bounding faults.

Microblock rotation 
Based on GPS measurement, a clockwise rotation of microblocks at a rate of 0.5° to 3.8° per million year relative to the Indo-Australian Plate is observed. This caused tectonic extension in Taupo Volcanic Zone and tectonic shortening in northwestern South Island, for example the Buller region.

In addition, the block rotation accommodates 25% to 65% of the trench parallel component from oblique subduction. Therefore, high rate trench parallel strike slip faults are absent in the North Island.

Rotation mechanism 
In the oblique subduction zone, the sinking slab is characterized by the Hikurangi plateau in the south. The thickness of this oceanic plateau ranges from 15 km to 10 km along the oceanic trench. The along strike thickness variation leads to differential subduction rate. In the southern trench, thick oceanic plateau induces high collisional resistance forces that cripples the subduction process. However, the thin oceanic crust in the north is subducted. This activated the tectonic block rotations about a nearby axis.

Closure of Northeastern Paleo-Tethys Ocean

Geological setting 
The Qinling-Dabieshan orogen in central China consists of three separate plates, including the north China plate, the Qinling-Dabieshan microplate, and the south China plate. Geological and geochemical analysis suggest that there was an ocean basin between the plates and it was part of the Paleo-Tethys Ocean

Evidence of oblique subduction 
Tectonic features of oblique subduction, for example a right lateral strike-slip thrust belt are identified in the tectonic zone. These evidence suggest that the south China plate was obliquely subducted to the northwest beneath the north China plate in the Early Mesozoic and led to the closure of the northeastern Paleo-Tethys Ocean.

Example of oblique subduction

Peru-Chile trench 

The Peru–Chile Trench is part of the Andean oblique subduction zone that was formed as a result of oblique subduction between the sinking Nazca Plate and the South American Plate. The current subduction direction is at east-north-east (see the summary below). However, geological record shows southeast subduction direction in Late Cretaceous period.

Margin parallel strike slip faults 

Four major trench parallel strike slip faults are identified in the oblique subduction zone. Liquiñe-Ofqui Fault is a 1,200 km long fault that located in the southern Andes. Left lateral strike slip motion was active during Mesozoic period. In Pliocene period, strike slip motion of the fault system changed to right lateral motion to accommodate the trench parallel slip component from oblique subduction.

The El Tigre Fault is observed in the central part of the subduction zone. It is a relatively short strike slip fault (ca. 120 km) that located further landward. The slip rate of the fault system is approximately 1 mm per year.

The Atacama Fault and the Precordilleran Fault are located in northern Chile. The Atacama Fault extends more than 1,000 km. It was formed during the Mid to Late Jurassic period as a left-lateral fault due to oblique subduction of the Phoenix Plate. The fault system has been inactive since the Miocene Period. The right lateral slip rate is estimated to be less than 1 mm per year since the Pliocene.

The Precordilleran Fault, also known as the Domeyko fault, is composed of several anastomosing faults (i.e. branching and irregular faults) including Sierra Moreno Fault, West Fault and Limon Verde. Precordilleran Fault was formed in the Late Eocene. In Neogene period, the fault system changed from left lateral to right lateral motion along with the uplift of the Precordillera.

Forearc sliver 

Two major forearc slivers are observed along the Peru-Chile Trench. The Peruvian Sliver, also known as Inca Sliver, has a width of 300 to 400 km and a total length of over 1,500 km. It extends from the Gulf of Guayaquil in the north to the Altiplano in the south. The continental boundary is located between the Western Cordillera and the Eastern Cordillera.

Chiloe Microplate, also known as Chiloe Block, is a forearc sliver that detached along the Liquine Ofqui Fault. It is bounded by Arauco Peninsula and Chile Triple Junction. The sliver moves northward with a motion rate ranges from 32 mm per year in the south to 13 mm per year in the north. This northward motion not only caused by the oblique subduction of the Nazca Plate, but also the oblique collision and spreading of the Chile Rise at the southern edge of the sliver.

See also 

 Subduction
 Plate tectonics
 Strain partitioning
 Strike slip fault
 Thrust
 Forearc
Oceanic trench

References 

Subduction